The Mary Alice Brandon File is a 2015 short film created as part of The Storytellers: New Voices of the Twilight Saga short film competition, which it went on to win. It depicts the early life of Alice Cullen, adoptive sister of Edward Cullen.

Plot
In a mental asylum, 19 year-old Mary Alice Brandon is subjected to torturous Electroshock therapy after she was locked up for having visions of the future. While being tortured memories of her family continue to flash through her mind.

Production
Officially produced by Lionsgate, the entire short was filmed in British Columbia, Canada, where most of the actual The Twilight Saga was shot. The Riverview Hospital, Roedde House Museum, and The Segal Building, (500 Granville St, Vancouver) were all used in the film. The special effects were completed by Goldtooth Creative.

Cast
 Paloma Kwiatkowski as Mary Alice Brandon
 Eileen Pedde as The Nurse
 Michael Hogan as The Doctor
 John Emmet Tracy as Edgar John Brandon
 Barbara Beall as Lillian Brandon
 Emma Tremblay as 	Young Mary Alice Brandon
 Erin Boyes as Anna Marie
 Audrey Smallman as Cynthia Brandon
 Jade Hudema as Strange Man
 Taylor Hickson as Townsfolk #1
 Melita Fawcett as Townsfolk #2
 Jason Stevens as Townsfolk #3
 Jodi Pongratz as Roommate
 Roger Haskett as Town Marshal
 Will Williams as The Groundskeeper

References

External links
 

2015 films
2015 short films
Works based on Twilight (novel series)
2010s English-language films